Bonduel may refer to:
Frans Bonduel (1907-1998), a Belgian bicycle racer
Bonduel, Wisconsin

See also
Bonduelle